The NORCECA qualification for the 2006 FIVB Volleyball Men's World Championship saw member nations compete for four places at the finals in Japan.

Draw
20 NORCECA national teams entered qualification. The teams were distributed according to their position in the FIVB Senior Men's Rankings as of 15 January 2004 using the serpentine system for their distribution. (Rankings shown in brackets) Teams ranked 1–6 did not compete in the first round, and automatically qualified for the second round.

First round

Second round

First round

Pool A
Venue:  Garfield Sobers Gymnasium, Bridgetown, Barbados
Dates: June 15–19, 2005
All times are Atlantic Standard Time (UTC−04:00)

|}

|}

Pool B
Venue:  UWI Sport & Physical Education Centre, Port of Spain, Trinidad and Tobago
Dates: May 25–29, 2009
All times are Atlantic Standard Time (UTC−04:00)

|}

|}

Pool C
Venue:  Polideportivo de Cartago, San José, Costa Rica
Dates: May 20–22, 2005
All times are Central Standard Time (UTC−06:00)

|}

|}

Second round

Pool D
Venue:  Coliseo Héctor Solá Bezares, Caguas, Puerto Rico
Dates: August 22–28, 2005
All times are Atlantic Standard Time (UTC−04:00)

Preliminary round

|}

|}

Final round

Semifinals

|}

3rd place

|}

Final

|}

Final standing

Pool E
Venue:  Sala Ramón Fonst, Havana, Cuba
Dates: August 17–21, 2005
All times are Cuba Daylight Time (UTC−04:00)

|}

|}

References

External links
 2006 World Championship Qualification

2006 FIVB Volleyball Men's World Championship
2005 in volleyball